San José  is a corregimiento in San Francisco District, Veraguas Province, Panama with a population of 2,555 as of 2010. It was created by Law 18 of January 24, 2003.

References

Corregimientos of Veraguas Province